Scottish Gaelic, also known as Scots Gaelic and Gaelic, is a Goidelic language (in the Celtic branch of the Indo-European language family) native to the Gaels of Scotland. As a Goidelic language, Scottish Gaelic, as well as both Irish and Manx, developed out of Old Irish (Old Gaelic). It became a distinct spoken language sometime in the 13th century in the Middle Irish (Middle Gaelic) period, although a common literary language was shared by the Gaels of both Ireland and Scotland until well into the 17th century. Most of modern Scotland was once Gaelic-speaking, as evidenced especially by Gaelic-language place names.

In the 2011 census of Scotland, 57,375 people (1.1% of the Scottish population aged over 3 years old) reported being able to speak Gaelic, 1,275 fewer than in 2001. The highest percentages of Gaelic speakers were in the Outer Hebrides. Nevertheless, there is a language revival, and the number of speakers of the language under age 20 did not decrease between the 2001 and 2011 censuses. Outside Scotland, a dialect known as Canadian Gaelic has been spoken in eastern Canada and Glengarry County, Ontario since the 18th century. In the 2016 national census, nearly 4,000 Canadian residents claimed knowledge of Scottish Gaelic, with a particular concentration in Nova Scotia.

Scottish Gaelic is not an official language of the United Kingdom. However, it is classed as an indigenous language under the European Charter for Regional or Minority Languages, which the UK Government has ratified, and the Gaelic Language (Scotland) Act 2005 established a language-development body, .

Name
Aside from "Scottish Gaelic", the language may also be referred to simply as "Gaelic", pronounced  in English. However, "Gaelic"  also refers to the Irish language and the Manx language.

Scottish Gaelic is distinct from Scots, the Middle English-derived language which had come to be spoken in most of the Lowlands of Scotland by the early modern era. Today, Scottish Gaelic is recognised as a separate language from Irish, so the word  in reference to Scottish Gaelic is no longer used.

History

Origins

An alternative view has been voiced by archaeologist Dr Ewan Campbell, who has argued that the putative migration or takeover is not reflected in archaeological or placename data (as pointed out earlier by Leslie Alcock). Campbell has also questioned the age and reliability of the medieval historical sources speaking of a conquest. Instead, he has inferred that Argyll formed part of a common Q-Celtic-speaking area with Ireland, connected rather than divided by the sea, since the Iron Age. These arguments have been opposed by some scholars defending the early dating of the traditional accounts and arguing for other interpretations of the archaeological evidence.

Regardless of how it came to be spoken in the region, Gaelic in Scotland was mostly confined to  until the eighth century, when it began expanding into Pictish areas north of the Firth of Forth and the Firth of Clyde. By a certain point, probably during the 11th century, all the inhabitants of Alba had become fully Gaelicised Scots, and Pictish identity was forgotten. Bilingualism in Pictish and Gaelic, prior to the former's extinction, led to the presence of Pictish loanwords in Gaelic and syntactic influence  which could be considered to constitute a Pictish substrate.

In 1018, after the conquest of Lothian by the Kingdom of Scotland, Gaelic reached its social, cultural, political, and geographic zenith. Colloquial speech in Scotland had been developing independently of that in Ireland since the eighth century. In southern Scotland, Gaelic was strong in Galloway, adjoining areas to the north and west, West Lothian, and parts of western Midlothian. It was spoken to a lesser degree in north Ayrshire, Renfrewshire, the Clyde Valley and eastern Dumfriesshire. In south-eastern Scotland, there is no evidence that Gaelic was ever widely spoken.

Decline

Many historians mark the reign of King Malcolm Canmore (Malcolm III) between 1058 and 1093 as the beginning of Gaelic's eclipse in Scotland. His wife Margaret of Wessex spoke no Gaelic, gave her children Anglo-Saxon rather than Gaelic names, and brought many English bishops, priests, and monastics to Scotland. When Malcolm and Margaret died in 1093, the Gaelic aristocracy rejected their anglicised sons and instead backed Malcolm's brother Donald Bàn (Donald III). Donald had spent 17 years in Gaelic Ireland and his power base was in the thoroughly Gaelic west of Scotland. However, during the reigns of Malcolm Canmore's sons, Edgar, Alexander I and David I (their successive reigns lasting 1097–1153), Anglo-Norman names and practices spread throughout Scotland south of the Forth–Clyde line and along the northeastern coastal plain as far north as Moray. Norman French completely displaced Gaelic at court. The establishment of royal burghs throughout the same area, particularly under David I, attracted large numbers of foreigners speaking Old English. This was the beginning of Gaelic's status as a predominantly rural language in Scotland.

Clan chiefs in the northern and western parts of Scotland continued to support Gaelic bards who remained a central feature of court life there. The semi-independent Lordship of the Isles in the Hebrides and western coastal mainland remained thoroughly Gaelic since the language's recovery there in the 12th century, providing a political foundation for cultural prestige down to the end of the 15th century.

By the mid-14th century what eventually came to be called Scots (at that time termed Inglis) emerged as the official language of government and law. Scotland's emergent nationalism in the era following the conclusion of the Wars of Scottish Independence was organized using Scots as well. For example, the nation's great patriotic literature including John Barbour's The Brus (1375) and Blind Harry's The Wallace (before 1488) was written in Scots, not Gaelic. By the end of the 15th century, English/Scots speakers referred to Gaelic instead as 'Yrisch' or 'Erse', i.e. Irish and their own language as 'Scottis'.

Modern era

A steady shift away from Scottish Gaelic continued into and through the modern era. Some of this was driven by policy decisions by government or other organisations, some originated from social changes. In the last quarter of the 20th century, efforts began to encourage use of the language.

The Statutes of Iona, enacted by James VI in 1609, was one piece of legislation that addressed, among other things, the Gaelic language. It compelled the heirs of clan chiefs to be educated in lowland, Protestant, English-speaking schools. James VI took several such measures to impose his rule on the Highland and Island region. In 1616 the Privy Council proclaimed that schools teaching in English should be established. Gaelic was seen, at this time, as one of the causes of the instability of the region. It was also associated with Catholicism.

The Society in Scotland for the Propagation of Christian Knowledge (SSPCK) was founded in 1709. They met in 1716, immediately after the failed Jacobite rebellion of 1715, to consider the reform and civilisation of the Highlands, which they sought to achieve by teaching English and the Protestant religion. Initially their teaching was entirely in English, but soon the impracticality of educating Gaelic-speaking children in this way gave rise to a modest concession: in 1723 teachers were allowed to translate English words in the Bible into Gaelic to aid comprehension, but there was no further permitted use. Other less prominent schools worked in the Highlands at the same time, also teaching in English. This process of anglicisation paused when evangelical preachers arrived in the Highlands, convinced that people should be able to read religious texts in their own language. The first well-known translation of the Bible into Scottish Gaelic was made in 1767 when Dr James Stuart of Killin and Dugald Buchanan of Rannoch produced a translation of the New Testament. In 1798 4 tracts in Gaelic were published by the Society for Propagating the Gospel at Home. 5,000 copies of each were printed. Other publications followed, with a full Gaelic Bible in 1801. The influential and effective Gaelic Schools Society was founded in 1811. Their purpose was to teach Gaels to read the Bible in their own language. In the first quarter of the 19th century, the SSPCK (despite their anti-Gaelic attitude in prior years) and the British and Foreign Bible Society distributed 60,000 Gaelic Bibles and 80,000 New Testaments. It is estimated that this overall schooling and publishing effort gave some 300,000 people in the Highlands some basic literacy. Very few European languages have made the transition to a modern literary language without an early modern translation of the Bible; the lack of a well-known translation may have contributed to the decline of Scottish Gaelic.

Counterintuitively, access to schooling in Gaelic increased knowledge of English. In 1829 the Gaelic Schools Society reported that parents were unconcerned about their children learning Gaelic, but were anxious to have them taught English. The SSPCK also found Highlanders to have significant prejudice against Gaelic. In 1863, an observer sympathetic to Gaelic stated that "knowledge of English is indispensable to any poor islander who wishes to learn a trade or to earn his bread beyond the limits of his native Isle". Generally, rather than Gaelic speakers, it was Celtic societies in the cities and professors of Celtic from universities who sought to preserve the language.

The Education (Scotland) Act 1872 provided universal education in Scotland, but completely ignored Gaelic in its plans. The mechanism for supporting Gaelic through the Education Codes issued by the Scottish Education Department were steadily used to overcome this omission, with many concessions in place by 1918. However, the members of Highland school boards tended to have anti-Gaelic attitudes and served as an obstacle to Gaelic education in the late 19th and early 20th century.

Loss of life due to World War I and the 1919 sinking of the HMY  combined with emigration to mean the 1910s saw unprecedented damage to the use of Scottish Gaelic, with a 46% fall in monolingual speakers and a 19% fall in bilingual speakers between the 1911 and 1921 Censuses. Michelle MacLeod of Aberdeen University, has said there was no other period with such a high fall in the number of monolingual Gaelic speakers: "Gaelic speakers became increasingly the exception from that point forward with bilingualism replacing monolingualism as the norm for Gaelic speakers."

The Linguistic Survey of Scotland (1949–1997) surveyed both the dialect of the Scottish Gaelic language, and also mixed use of English and Gaelic across the Highlands and Islands.

Defunct dialects
Dialects of Lowland Gaelic have been defunct since the 18th century. Gaelic in the Eastern and Southern Scottish Highlands, although alive until the mid-20th century, is now largely defunct. Although modern Scottish Gaelic is dominated by the dialects of the Outer Hebrides and Isle of Skye, there remain some speakers of the Inner Hebridean dialects of Tiree and Islay, and even a few native speakers from Western Highland areas including Wester Ross, northwest Sutherland, Lochaber and Argyll. Dialects on both sides of the Straits of Moyle (the North Channel) linking Scottish Gaelic with Irish are now extinct, though native speakers were still to be found on the Mull of Kintyre, on Rathlin and in North East Ireland as late as the mid-20th century. Records of their speech show that Irish and Scottish Gaelic existed in a dialect chain with no clear language boundary.

Status

The Endangered Languages Project lists Gaelic's status as "threatened", with "20,000 to 30,000 active users". UNESCO classifies Gaelic as "definitely endangered".

Number of speakers

The 1755–2001 figures are census data quoted by MacAulay. The 2011 Gaelic speakers figures come from table KS206SC of the 2011 Census. The 2011 total population figure comes from table KS101SC. Note that the numbers of Gaelic speakers relate to the numbers aged 3 and over, and the percentages are calculated using those and the number of the total population aged 3 and over.

Distribution in Scotland

The 2011 UK Census showed a total of 57,375 Gaelic speakers in Scotland (1.1% of population over three years old), of whom only 32,400 could also read and write the language. Compared with the 2001 Census, there has been a diminution of about 1300 people. This is the smallest drop between censuses since the Gaelic-language question was first asked in 1881. The Scottish government's language minister and  took this as evidence that Gaelic's long decline has slowed.

The main stronghold of the language continues to be the Outer Hebrides, where the overall proportion of speakers is 52.2%. Important pockets of the language also exist in the Highlands (5.4%) and in Argyll and Bute (4.0%) and Inverness (4.9%). The locality with the largest absolute number is Glasgow with 5,878 such persons, who make up over 10% of all of Scotland's Gaelic speakers.

Gaelic continues to decline in its traditional heartland. Between 2001 and 2011, the absolute number of Gaelic speakers fell sharply in the Western Isles (−1,745), Argyll & Bute (−694), and Highland (−634). The drop in Stornoway, the largest parish in the Western Isles by population, was especially acute, from 57.5% of the population in 1991 to 43.4% in 2011. The only parish outside the Western Isles over 40% Gaelic-speaking is Kilmuir in Northern Skye at 46%. The islands in the Inner Hebrides with significant percentages of Gaelic speakers are Tiree (38.3%), Raasay (30.4%), Skye (29.4%), Lismore (26.9%), Colonsay (20.2%), and Islay (19.0%).

Today, no civil parish in Scotland has a proportion of Gaelic speakers greater than 65% (the highest value is in Barvas, Lewis, with 64.1%). In addition, no civil parish on mainland Scotland has a proportion of Gaelic speakers greater than 20% (the highest is in Ardnamurchan, Highland, with 19.3%). Out of a total of 871 civil parishes in Scotland, the proportion of Gaelic speakers exceeds 50% in seven parishes, 25% in 14 parishes, and 10% in 35 parishes. 

Decline in traditional areas has recently been balanced by growth in the Scottish Lowlands. Between the 2001 and 2011 censuses, the number of Gaelic speakers rose in nineteen of the country's 32 council areas. The largest absolute gains were in Aberdeenshire (+526), North Lanarkshire (+305), Aberdeen City (+216), and East Ayrshire (+208). The largest relative gains were in Aberdeenshire (+0.19%), East Ayrshire (+0.18%), Moray (+0.16%), and Orkney (+0.13%).

In 2018, the census of pupils in Scotland showed 520 students in publicly funded schools had Gaelic as the main language at home, an increase of 5% from 497 in 2014. During the same period, Gaelic medium education in Scotland has grown, with 4,343 pupils (6.3 per 1000) being educated in a Gaelic-immersion environment in 2018, up from 3,583 pupils (5.3 per 1000) in 2014. Data collected in 2007–2008 indicated that even among pupils enrolled in Gaelic medium schools, 81% of primary students and 74% of secondary students report using English more often than Gaelic when speaking with their mothers at home. The effect on this of the significant increase in pupils in Gaelic-medium education since that time is unknown.

Preservation and revitalization 
Gaelic Medium Education is one of the primary ways that the Scottish Government is addressing Gaelic language shift. Along with the Bòrd na Gàidhlig policies, preschool and daycare environments are also being used to create more opportunities for intergenerational language transmission in the Outer Hebrides.  However, revitalization efforts are not unified within Scotland or Nova Scotia, Canada. One can attend Sabhal Mòr Ostaig, a national centre for Gaelic Language and Culture, based in Sleat, on the Isle of Skye. This institution is the only source for higher education which is conducted entirely in Scottish Gaelic. They offer courses for Gaelic learners from beginners into fluency. They also offer regular bachelors and graduate programs delivered entirely in Gaelic. Concerns have been raised around the fluency achieved by learners within these language programs because they are disconnected from vernacular speech communities. In regard to language revitalization planning efforts, many feel that the initiatives must come from within Gaelic speaking communities, be led by Gaelic speakers, and be designed to serve and increase fluency within the vernacular communities as the first and most viable resistance to total language shift from Gaelic to English. Currently, language policies are focused on creating new language speakers through education, instead of focused on how to strengthen intergenerational transmission within existing Gaelic speaking communities.

Challenges to preservation and revitalization 
In the Outer Hebrides, accommodation ethics exist amongst native or local Gaelic speakers when engaging with new learners or non-locals. Accommodation ethics, or ethics of accommodation, is a social practice where local or native speakers of Gaelic shift to speaking English when in the presence of non-Gaelic speakers out of a sense of courtesy or politeness. This accommodation ethic persists even in situations where new learners attempt to speak Gaelic with native speakers. This creates a situation where new learners struggle to find opportunities to speak Gaelic with fluent speakers. Affect is the way people feel about something, or the emotional response to a particular situation or experience. For Gaelic speakers, there is a conditioned and socialized negative affect through a long history of negative Scottish media portrayal and public disrespect, state mandated restrictions on Gaelic usage, and highland clearances. This negative affect towards speaking openly with non-native Gaelic speakers has led to a language ideology at odds with revitalization efforts on behalf of new speakers, state policies (such as the Gaelic Language Act), and family members reclaiming their lost mother tongue. New learners of Gaelic often have a positive affective stance to their language learning, and connect this learning journey towards Gaelic language revitalization. The mismatch of these language ideologies, and differences in affective stance, has led to fewer speaking opportunities for adult language learners and therefore a challenge to revitalization efforts which occur outside the home. Positive engagements between language learners and native speakers of Gaelic through mentorship has proven to be productive in socializing new learners into fluency.

Usage

Official

Scotland

Scottish Parliament

Gaelic has long suffered from its lack of use in educational and administrative contexts and was long suppressed.

The UK government has ratified the European Charter for Regional or Minority Languages in respect of Gaelic. Gaelic, along with Irish and Welsh, is designated under Part III of the Charter, which requires the UK Government to take a range of concrete measures in the fields of education, justice, public administration, broadcasting and culture. It has not received the same degree of official recognition from the UK Government as Welsh. With the advent of devolution, however, Scottish matters have begun to receive greater attention, and it achieved a degree of official recognition when the Gaelic Language (Scotland) Act was enacted by the Scottish Parliament on 21 April 2005.

The key provisions of the Act are:
 Establishing the Gaelic development body,  (BnG), on a statutory basis with a view to securing the status of the Gaelic language as an official language of Scotland commanding equal respect to the English language and to promote the use and understanding of Gaelic.
 Requiring BnG to prepare a National Gaelic Language Plan every five years for approval by Scottish Ministers.
 Requiring BnG to produce guidance on Gaelic medium education and Gaelic as a subject for education authorities.
 Requiring public bodies in Scotland, both Scottish public bodies and cross-border public bodies insofar as they carry out devolved functions, to develop Gaelic language plans in relation to the services they offer, if requested to do so by BnG.

After its creation, Bòrd na Gàidhlig required a Gaelic Language Plan from the Scottish Government. This plan was accepted in 2008, and some of its main commitments were: identity (signs, corporate identity); communications (reception, telephone, mailings, public meetings, complaint procedures); publications (PR and media, websites); staffing (language learning, training, recruitment).

In the committee stages in the Scottish Parliament, there was much debate over whether Gaelic should be given 'equal validity' with English. Due to executive concerns about resourcing implications if this wording was used, the Education Committee settled on the concept of 'equal respect'. It is not clear what the legal force of this wording is.

The Act was passed by the Scottish Parliament unanimously, with support from all sectors of the Scottish political spectrum, on 21 April 2005. Under the provisions of the Act, it will ultimately fall to BnG to secure the status of the Gaelic language as an official language of Scotland.

On 10 December 2008, to celebrate the 60th anniversary of the Universal Declaration of Human Rights, the Scottish Human Rights Commission had the UDHR translated into Gaelic for the first time.

However, given there are no longer any monolingual Gaelic speakers, following an appeal in the court case of Taylor v Haughney (1982), involving the status of Gaelic in judicial proceedings, the High Court ruled against a general right to use Gaelic in court proceedings.

While the goal of the Gaelic Language Act was to aid in revitalization efforts through government mandated official language status, the outcome of the act is distanced from the actual minority language communities. It helps to create visibility of the minority language in civil structures, but does not impact or address the lived experiences of the Gaelic speaker communities wherein the revitalization efforts may have a higher return of new Gaelic speakers. Efforts are being made to concentrate resources, language planning, and revitalization efforts towards vernacular communities in the Western Isles.

Qualifications in the language
The Scottish Qualifications Authority offer two streams of Gaelic examination across all levels of the syllabus: Gaelic for learners (equivalent to the modern foreign languages syllabus) and Gaelic for native speakers (equivalent to the English syllabus).

 performs assessment of spoken Gaelic, resulting in the issue of a Bronze Card, Silver Card or Gold Card. Syllabus details are available on An Comunn's website. These are not widely recognised as qualifications, but are required for those taking part in certain competitions at the annual .

European Union

In October 2009, a new agreement allowed Scottish Gaelic to be formally used between Scottish Government ministers and European Union officials. The deal was signed by Britain's representative to the EU, Sir Kim Darroch, and the Scottish government. This did not give Scottish Gaelic official status in the EU but gave it the right to be a means of formal communications in the EU's institutions. The Scottish government had to pay for the translation from Gaelic to other European languages. The deal was received positively in Scotland; Secretary of State for Scotland Jim Murphy said the move was a strong sign of the UK government's support for Gaelic. He said; "Allowing Gaelic speakers to communicate with European institutions in their mother tongue is a progressive step forward and one which should be welcomed". Culture Minister Mike Russell said; "this is a significant step forward for the recognition of Gaelic both at home and abroad and I look forward to addressing the council in Gaelic very soon. Seeing Gaelic spoken in such a forum raises the profile of the language as we drive forward our commitment to creating a new generation of Gaelic speakers in Scotland."

Signage

Bilingual road signs, street names, business and advertisement signage (in both Gaelic and English) are gradually being introduced throughout Gaelic-speaking regions in the Highlands and Islands, including Argyll.

Some monolingual Gaelic road signs, particularly direction signs, are used on the Outer Hebrides, where a majority of the population can have a working knowledge of the language. These omit the English translation entirely.

Bilingual railway station signs are now more frequent than they used to be. Practically all the stations in the Highland area use both English and Gaelic, and the use of bilingual station signs has become more frequent in the Lowlands of Scotland, including areas where Gaelic has not been spoken for a long time.

This has been welcomed by many supporters of the language as a means of raising its profile as well as securing its future as a 'living language' (i.e. allowing people to use it to navigate from A to B in place of English) and creating a sense of place. However, in some places, such as Caithness, the Highland Council's intention to introduce bilingual signage has incited controversy.

The Ordnance Survey has acted in recent years to correct many of the mistakes that appear on maps. They announced in 2004 that they intended to correct them and set up a committee to determine the correct forms of Gaelic place names for their maps. Ainmean-Àite na h-Alba ("Place names in Scotland") is the national advisory partnership for Gaelic place names in Scotland.

Canada

In the nineteenth century, Canadian Gaelic was the third-most widely spoken European language in British North America and Gaelic-speaking immigrant communities could be found throughout what is modern-day Canada. Gaelic poets in Canada produced a significant literary tradition. The number of Gaelic-speaking individuals and communities declined sharply, however, after the First World War.

Nova Scotia 

At the start of the 21st century, it was estimated that no more than 500 people in Nova Scotia still spoke Scottish Gaelic as a first language. In the 2011 census, 300 people claimed to have Gaelic as their first language (a figure that may include Irish Gaelic). In the same 2011 census, 1,275 people claimed to speak Gaelic, a figure that not only included all Gaelic languages but also those people who are not first language speakers, of whom 300 claim to have Gaelic as their "mother tongue."

The Nova Scotia government maintains the Office of Gaelic Affairs, which is dedicated to the development of Scottish Gaelic language, culture and tourism in Nova Scotia, and which estimates about 2,000 total Gaelic speakers to be in the province. As in Scotland, areas of North-Eastern Nova Scotia and Cape Breton have bilingual street signs. Nova Scotia also has  (The Gaelic Council of Nova Scotia), a non-profit society dedicated to the maintenance and promotion of the Gaelic language and culture in Maritime Canada. In 2018, the Nova Scotia government launched a new Gaelic vehicle licence plate to raise awareness of the language and help fund Gaelic language and culture initiatives.

In September 2021, the first Gaelic-medium primary school outside of Scotland, named , opened in Mabou, Nova Scotia.

Outside Nova Scotia 
Maxville Public School in Maxville, Glengarry, Ontario, offers Scottish Gaelic lessons weekly.

In Prince Edward Island, the Colonel Gray High School now offers both an introductory and an advanced course in Gaelic; both language and history are taught in these classes. This is the first recorded time that Gaelic has ever been taught as an official course on Prince Edward Island.

The city of Vancouver's Scottish Cultural Centre also holds seasonal Scottish Gaelic evening classes.

Media

The BBC operates a Gaelic-language radio station  as well as a television channel, . Launched on 19 September 2008, BBC Alba is widely available in the UK (on Freeview, Freesat, Sky and Virgin Media). It also broadcasts across Europe on the Astra 2 satellites. The channel is being operated in partnership between BBC Scotland and  – an organisation funded by the Scottish Government, which works to promote the Gaelic language in broadcasting. The ITV franchise in central Scotland, STV Central, has, in the past, produced a number of Scottish Gaelic programmes for both BBC Alba and its own main channel.

Until BBC Alba was broadcast on Freeview, viewers were able to receive the channel , which broadcast for an hour every evening. Upon BBC Alba's launch on Freeview, it took the channel number that was previously assigned to TeleG.

There are also television programmes in the language on other BBC channels and on the independent commercial channels, usually subtitled in English. The ITV franchise in the north of Scotland, STV North (formerly Grampian Television) produces some non-news programming in Scottish Gaelic.

Education

Scotland

 

The Education (Scotland) Act 1872, which completely ignored Gaelic and led to generations of Gaels being forbidden to speak their native language in the classroom is now recognised as having dealt a major blow to the language. People still living in 2001 could recall being beaten for speaking Gaelic in school. Even later, when these attitudes had changed, little provision was made for Gaelic medium education in Scottish schools. As late as 1958, even in Highland schools, only 20% of primary students were taught Gaelic as a subject, and only 5% were taught other subjects through the Gaelic language.

Gaelic-medium playgroups for young children began to appear in Scotland during the late 1970s and early 1980s. Parent enthusiasm may have been a factor in the "establishment of the first Gaelic medium primary school units in Glasgow and Inverness in 1985".

The first modern solely Gaelic-medium secondary school,  ("Glasgow Gaelic School"), was opened at Woodside in Glasgow in 2006 (61 partially Gaelic-medium primary schools and approximately a dozen Gaelic-medium secondary schools also exist).

In November 2019, the language-learning app Duolingo opened a beta course in Gaelic.

Starting from summer 2020, children starting school in the Western Isles will be enrolled in GME (Gaelic-medium education) unless parents request differently. Children will be taught Scottish Gaelic from P1 to P4 and then English will be introduced to give them a bilingual education.

Canada
In May 2004, the Nova Scotia government announced the funding of an initiative to support the language and its culture within the province. Several public schools in Northeastern Nova Scotia and Cape Breton offer Gaelic classes as part of the high-school curriculum.

Maxville Public School in Maxville, Glengarry, Ontario, offers Scottish Gaelic lessons weekly. In Prince Edward Island, the Colonel Gray High School offer an introductory and an advanced course in Scottish Gaelic.

Higher and further education
A number of Scottish and some Irish universities offer full-time degrees including a Gaelic language element, usually graduating as Celtic Studies.

In Nova Scotia, Canada, St. Francis Xavier University, the Gaelic College of Celtic Arts and Crafts and Cape Breton University (formerly known as the "University College of Cape Breton") offer Celtic Studies degrees and/or Gaelic language programs. The government's Office of Gaelic Affairs offers lunch-time lessons to public servants in Halifax.

In Russia the Moscow State University offers Gaelic language, history and culture courses.

The University of the Highlands and Islands offers a range of Gaelic language, history and culture courses at the National Certificate, Higher National Diploma, Bachelor of Arts (ordinary), Bachelor of Arts (Honours) and Master of Science levels. It offers opportunities for postgraduate research through the medium of Gaelic. Many continue to complete degrees, or to follow up as distance learners. A number of other colleges offer a one-year certificate course, which is also available online (pending accreditation).

Lews Castle College's Benbecula campus offers an independent 1-year course in Gaelic and Traditional Music (FE, SQF level 5/6).

Church

In the Western Isles, the isles of Lewis, Harris and North Uist have a Presbyterian majority (largely Church of Scotland –  in Gaelic, Free Church of Scotland and Free Presbyterian Church of Scotland). The isles of South Uist and Barra have a Catholic majority. All these churches have Gaelic-speaking congregations throughout the Western Isles. Notable city congregations with regular services in Gaelic are St Columba's Church, Glasgow and Greyfriars Tolbooth & Highland Kirk, Edinburgh. —a shorter Gaelic version of the English-language Book of Common Order—was published in 1996 by the Church of Scotland.

The widespread use of English in worship has often been suggested as one of the historic reasons for the decline of Gaelic. The Church of Scotland is supportive today, but has a shortage of Gaelic-speaking ministers. The Free Church also recently announced plans to abolish Gaelic-language communion services, citing both a lack of ministers and a desire to have their congregations united at communion time.

Literature

From the sixth century to the present day, Scottish Gaelic has been used as a literary language. Two prominent writers of the twentieth century are Anne Frater and Sorley Maclean.

Names

Personal names
Not all traditional Gaelic names have direct equivalents in English: , which is normally rendered as Euphemia (Effie) or Henrietta (Etta) (formerly also as Henny or even as Harriet), or, which is "matched" with Dorothy, simply on the basis of a certain similarity in spelling. Many of these traditional Gaelic-only names are now regarded as old-fashioned, and hence are rarely or never used.

These are conventionally rendered in English as Sorley (or, historically, Somerled), Norman, Ronald or Ranald, Torquil and Iver (or Evander).

Some Scottish names are Anglicized forms of Gaelic names:  → (Angus), → (Donald), for instance.

Surnames

Several colours give rise to common Scottish surnames:  (Bain – white),  (Roy – red),  (Dow, Duff – black),  (Dunn – brown),  (Bowie – yellow) although in Gaelic these occur as part of a fuller form such as  'son of the servant of', i.e. .

Phonology

Most varieties of Gaelic show either eight or nine vowel qualities in their inventory of vowel phonemes, which can be either long or short. There are also two reduced vowels which occur only in their short versions. Although some vowels are strongly nasal, instances of distinctive nasality are rare. There are about nine diphthongs and a few triphthongs.

Most consonants have both palatal and non-palatal counterparts, including a very rich system of liquids, nasals and trills (i.e. three contrasting "l" sounds, three contrasting "n" sounds and three contrasting "r" sounds). The historically voiced stops  have lost their voicing, so the phonemic contrast today is between unaspirated  and aspirated .

In some fixed phrases, these changes are shown permanently, as the link with the base words has been lost, as in  "now", from  "this time/period".

In medial and final position, the aspirated stops are preaspirated rather than postaspirated.

Grammar

Scottish Gaelic is an Indo-European language with an inflecting morphology, verb–subject–object word order and two grammatical genders.

Noun inflection
Gaelic nouns inflect for four cases (nominative/accusative, vocative, genitive and dative) and three numbers (singular, dual and plural).

They are also normally classed as either masculine or feminine. A small number of words that used to belong to the neuter class show some degree of gender confusion. For example, in some dialects  "the sea" behaves as a masculine noun in the nominative case, but as a feminine noun in the genitive.

Nouns are marked for case in a number of ways, most commonly involving various combinations of lenition, palatalisation and suffixation.

Verb inflection
There are 12 irregular verbs. Most other verbs follow a fully predictable paradigm, although polysyllabic verbs ending in laterals can deviate from this paradigm as they show syncopation.

There are:
 Three persons: 1st, 2nd and 3rd
 Two numbers: singular and plural
 Two voices: traditionally called active and passive, but actually personal and impersonal
 Three non-composed combined TAM forms expressing tense, aspect and mood, i.e. non-past (future-habitual), conditional (future of the past), and past (preterite); several composed TAM forms, such as pluperfect, future perfect, present perfect, present continuous, past continuous, conditional perfect, etc.
 Four moods: independent (used in affirmative main clause verbs), relative (used in verbs in affirmative relative clauses), dependent (used in subordinate clauses, anti-affirmative relative clauses, and anti-affirmative main clauses), and subjunctive.

Word order
Word order is strictly verb–subject–object, including questions, negative questions and negatives. Only a restricted set of preverb particles may occur before the verb.

Lexicon
The majority of the vocabulary of Scottish Gaelic is of Celtic origin. However, Gaelic contains substantially more words of non-Goidelic extraction than Irish. The main sources of loanwords into Gaelic are the Germanic languages English, Scots and Norse. Other sources include Latin, French and the Brittonic languages.

Many direct Latin loanwords in Scottish Gaelic were adopted during the Old and Middle Irish (600 AD-1200 AD) stages of the language and are often terms related to Christianity.

Brittonic 
The Brittonic languages Cumbric and Pictish were spoken in Scotland during the Early to High Middle Ages, and Scottish Gaelic has many Brittonic influences. Scottish Gaelic contains a number of apparently P-Celtic loanwords, but it is not always possible to disentangle P and Q Celtic words.

Scottish Gaelic contains a number of words, principally toponymic elements, that are more closely aligned in their usage and sense with their Brittonic cognates than their Irish. This is indicative of the operation of a Brittonic substrate influence. Such items include:

Neologisms 
In common with other Indo-European languages, the neologisms coined for modern concepts are typically based on Greek or Latin, although often coming through English; television, for instance, becomes  and computer becomes . Some speakers use an English word even if there is a Gaelic equivalent, applying the rules of Gaelic grammar. With verbs, for instance, they will simply add the verbal suffix (or, in Lewis, as in, " watch  (Lewis, "watch ")  telly" (I am watching the television), instead of "". This phenomenon was described over 170 years ago, by the minister who compiled the account covering the parish of Stornoway in the New Statistical Account of Scotland, and examples can be found dating to the eighteenth century. However, as Gaelic medium education grows in popularity, a newer generation of literate Gaels has become more familiar with modern Gaelic vocabulary.

Loanwords into other languages
Scottish Gaelic has also influenced the Scots language and English, particularly Scottish Standard English. Irish has also influenced Lowland Scots and English in Scotland, but it is not always easy to distinguish its influence from that of Scottish Gaelic.

Orthography

Scottish Gaelic orthography is very regular; its standard was set by the 1767 New Testament. The 1981 Scottish Examination Board recommendations for Scottish Gaelic, the Gaelic Orthographic Conventions, were adopted by most publishers and agencies, although they remain controversial among some academics, most notably Ronald Black.

The quality of consonants (broad or slender) is indicated by the vowels surrounding them. Slender (palatalised) consonants are surrounded by slender vowels, while broad (neutral or velarised) consonants are surrounded by broad vowels.

This rule sometimes leads to the insertion of a silent written vowel. For example, plurals in Gaelic are often formed with the suffix  , for example,   ("shoe") /   ("shoes").

Unstressed vowels omitted in speech can be omitted in informal writing, e.g.  ("I hope.") > 

Scots English orthographic rules have also been used at various times in Gaelic writing. Notable examples of Gaelic verse composed in this manner are the Book of the Dean of Lismore and the  manuscript.

Alphabet

The modern Scottish Gaelic alphabet has 18 letters: .  is mostly used to indicate lenition of a consonant, it was not used in older writings, since lenition was indicated by an overdot. The letters of the alphabet were traditionally named after trees, but this custom has fallen out of use.

Long vowels are marked with a grave accent, indicated through digraphs (e.g.  for ) or conditioned by certain consonant environments (e.g.  preceding a non-intervocalic  is ).

Certain 18th century sources used only an acute accent along the lines of Irish, such as in the writings of Alasdair mac Mhaighstir Alasdair (1741–51) and the earliest editions (1768–90) of Duncan Ban MacIntyre.

Example text
Article 1 of the Universal Declaration of Human Rights in Scottish Gaelic: 

Article 1 of the Universal Declaration of Human Rights in English:
All human beings are born free and equal in dignity and rights. They are endowed with reason and conscience and should act towards one another in a spirit of brotherhood.

Common words and phrases with Irish and Manx equivalents

Note: Items in brackets denote archaic, dialectal or regional variant forms

References

Explanatory notes

Citations

Further reading 
 Gillies, H. Cameron. (1896). Elements of Gaelic Grammar. Vancouver: Global Language Press (reprint 2006),  (hardcover),  (paperback)
 Gillies, William. (1993). "Scottish Gaelic", in Ball, Martin J. and Fife, James (eds). The Celtic Languages (Routledge Language Family Descriptions). London: Routledge.  (paperback), pp. 145–227
 Lamb, William. (2001). Scottish Gaelic. Munich: Lincom Europa, 
 . (2007).  – A Gaelic Thesaurus. Lulu Enterprises, North Carolina
 McLeod, Wilson (ed.). (2006). Revitalising Gaelic in Scotland: Policy, Planning and Public Discourse. Edinburgh: Dunedin Academic Press, 
 Robertson, Charles M. (1906–07). "Scottish Gaelic Dialects", The Celtic Review, vol. 3 pp. 97–113, 223–39, 319–32.

External links 

  – Scottish Gaelic language, music and news
 "Gaelic in Medieval Scotland: Advent and Expansion" by Thomas Owen Clancy, Sir John Rhys Memorial Lecture, 4 March 2009
 Gaelic Resource Database – founded by Comhairle nan Eilean Siar
 Scottish Gaelic Swadesh list of basic vocabulary words (from Wiktionary's Swadesh-list appendix)
  – Dwelly's Gaelic dictionary online
  – 's links to pages in and about Scottish Gaelic
 DASG – The Digital Archive of Scottish Gaelic
 An Comunn's website
 Nova Scotia Office of Gaelic Affairs

 
Articles containing video clips
Endangered Celtic languages
Fusional languages
Languages of Canada
Languages of the United Kingdom
Verb–subject–object languages